Eunephrops is a genus of lobsters, containing four species, all found in the Western Atlantic Ocean:
Eunephrops bairdii Smith, 1885
Eunephrops cadenasi Chace, 1939
Eunephrops luckhursti Manning, 1997
Eunephrops manningi Holthuis, 1974

References

True lobsters
Crustaceans of the Atlantic Ocean
Taxa named by Sidney Irving Smith